Mariando Djonak Uropmabin (born 26 September 1995) is an Indonesian professional footballer who played as a winger.

Career

Sriwijaya
Mariando made his professional debut with Sriwijaya FC against Mitra Kukar.

Perseru Serui
In 2017, he joined Perseru Serui for a Liga 1 match. Mariando made his debut on 20 April 2017 in a match against Bhayangkara. Mariando first scored in a match against Madura United. He made 32 league appearances and scored 5 goals for Perseru Serui.

Semen Padang
In September 2019, he rejoined Semen Padang for second half of 2019 Liga 1 (Indonesia). He made his league debut on 16 October 2019 in a match against Persija Jakarta. On 16 October 2019, Mariando scored his first goal for Semen Padang against Persija Jakarta in the 95th minute at the Patriot Candrabaga Stadium, Bekasi.

Arema
In 2020, Urobmabin signed a contract with Indonesian Liga 1 club Arema. The 2020 Liga 1 competition stopped only after three games due to the COVID-19 pandemic that led to restrictions against professional football matches for one full year.

Persiba Balikpapan
In 2021, Urobmabin signed a contract with Indonesian Liga 2 club Persiba Balikpapan. He made his league debut on 6 October 2021 against Kalteng Putra at the Tuah Pahoe Stadium, Palangka Raya.

International career
Mariando was selected the best player of the year when Indonesia under-19 team became champions the HKFA Youth Invitation Tournament in Hong Kong in 2013.

Career statistics

Club

Honours

International 
Indonesia U-19
 HKFA International Youth Invitation: 2013

References

External links
 Mariando Uropmabin at Soccerway
 Mariando Uropmabin at Liga Indonesia

1995 births
Living people
Liga 1 (Indonesia) players
Perseru Serui players
Badak Lampung F.C. players
Semen Padang F.C. players
Sriwijaya F.C. players
PS Barito Putera players
Indonesian footballers
Indonesian Christians
Association football forwards
Sportspeople from Papua